aka Tora-san, Hold Out! is a 1977 Japanese comedy film directed by Yoji Yamada. It stars Kiyoshi Atsumi as Torajirō Kuruma (Tora-san), and Shiho Fujimura as his love interest or "Madonna". Tora-san Plays Cupid is the twentieth entry in the popular, long-running Otoko wa Tsurai yo series.

Synopsis
Tora-san plays at matchmaker, trying to arrange a romance between Ryōsuke and Sachiko. His advice proves disastrous and Tora-san instead falls in love with Ryōsuke's sister.

Cast
 Kiyoshi Atsumi as Torajirō
 Chieko Baisho as Sakura
 Shiho Fujimura as Fujiko Shimada
 Masatoshi Nakamura as Ryōsuke Shimada
 Shinobu Otake as Sachiko Fukumura
 Masami Shimojō as Kuruma Tatsuzō
 Chieko Misaki as Tsune Kuruma (Torajiro's aunt)
 Gin Maeda as Hiroshi Suwa
 Hayato Nakamura as Mitsuo Suwa
 Hisao Dazai as Boss (Umetarō Katsura)
 Gajirō Satō as Genkō

Critical appraisal
Kiyoshi Atsumi was nominated for Best Actor at the Japan Academy Prize ceremony for his performances in Tora-san Plays Cupid, Tora-san Meets His Lordship and Yatsuhaka-mura (all 1977). Chieko Baisho was also nominated for Best Actress and Shinobu Otake for Best Supporting Actress at the same ceremony.
Stuart Galbraith IV judges the film to be another good entry in the Otoko wa Tsurai yo series, funny and with a strong supporting cast. The German-language site molodezhnaja gives Tora-san Plays Cupid three and a half out of five stars.

Availability
Tora-san Plays Cupid was released theatrically on December 29, 1977. In Japan, the film was released on videotape in 1996, and in DVD format in 1998, 2002, and 2008.

References

Bibliography

English

German

Japanese

External links
 Tora-san Plays Cupid at www.tora-san.jp (official site)

1977 films
Films directed by Yoji Yamada
1977 comedy films
1970s Japanese-language films
Otoko wa Tsurai yo films
Japanese sequel films
Shochiku films
Films with screenplays by Yôji Yamada
1970s Japanese films